Alfred Tredway White (May 28, 1846 – January 29, 1921) was an American housing reformer and philanthropist, and was known as "Brooklyn's first citizen." He developed the Home Buildings (1877), Tower Buildings (1879, now Cobble Hill Towers) and the Riverside Buildings (1890). He advocated a model of "philanthropy plus five percent," accepting a limited financial return on his projects.

White's buildings were extensively praised by Jacob Riis in "How The Other Half Lives" as a "beau ideal" and a "big village of contented people." They covered roughly half of their lots, leaving large courtyards suitable for concerts and other recreation.

He served as Commissioner of City Works for Brooklyn during the administration of Mayor Schieren.

He was an early benefactor of the Brooklyn Botanic Garden, and is memorialized there by the Alfred T. White Memorial and Amphitheater. He was also a major supporter of both the Hampton Institute and Tuskegee Institute. He was a member of the Unitarian Universalist church.

Thredway White died in 1921, leaving some $15 million to his daughter Annie Jean Van Sinderen.

References 

1846 births
1921 deaths
People from Brooklyn
American real estate businesspeople
Philanthropists from New York (state)
19th-century American businesspeople
American Unitarian Universalists